Lars Daniel Norling (16 January 1888 – 28 August 1958) was a Swedish Army officer, gymnast and equestrian who participated in the 1908 Summer Olympics, in the 1912 Summer Olympics, and in the 1920 Summer Olympics.

He was part of the Swedish team, which was able to win the gold medal in the gymnastics men's team event in 1908. In the 1912 Summer Olympics he won his second gold medal as member of the Swedish gymnastics team in the Swedish system event.

At the 1920 Summer Olympics in Antwerp, he was a member of the Swedish Equestrian jumping team, which won the gold medal.

Norling was promoted to major in 1937.

Awards and decorations
Knight of the Order of the Sword
Second Class of the Military Cross

See also
 Dual sport and multi-sport Olympians

References

External links
 
profile

1888 births
1958 deaths
Swedish Army officers
Swedish male artistic gymnasts
Swedish male equestrians
Gymnasts at the 1908 Summer Olympics
Gymnasts at the 1912 Summer Olympics
Equestrians at the 1920 Summer Olympics
Olympic equestrians of Sweden
Olympic gymnasts of Sweden
Olympic gold medalists for Sweden
Olympic medalists in gymnastics
Olympic medalists in equestrian
Knights of the Order of the Sword
Medalists at the 1920 Summer Olympics
Medalists at the 1912 Summer Olympics
Medalists at the 1908 Summer Olympics
20th-century Swedish people